The 2021–22 Buffalo Bulls men's basketball team represented the University at Buffalo in the 2021–22 NCAA Division I men's basketball season. The Bulls, led by third-year head coach Jim Whitesell, played their home games at Alumni Arena in Amherst, New York as members of the Mid-American Conference.

Previous season
The Bulls finished the 2020–21 season 16–9, 12–5 in MAC play to finish in second place. In the MAC tournament, they defeated Miami (OH) in the first round, Akron in the quarterfinals, advancing to the championship game. In the title game, they lost to Ohio. They received an invitation to the NIT, where they would lose to Colorado State in the first round.

Roster

Schedule and results

|-
!colspan=12 style=| Exhibition

|-
!colspan=12 style=| Non-conference regular season

|-
!colspan=12 style=| MAC regular season

|-
!colspan=12 style=| MAC Tournament

Source

References

Buffalo Bulls men's basketball seasons
Buffalo Bulls
Buffalo Bulls men's basketball
Buffalo Bulls men's basketball